The 1980 Men's World Outdoor Bowls Championship  was held at the City of Frankston Bowling Club in Frankston, Melbourne, Australia, from 17 January to 2 February 1980.

The Australian government would not allow the South African team to compete because of the South African policy of apartheid.

David Bryant won his second singles title following his triumph in the 1966 competition.

Australia won the pairs, England won the triples and Hong Kong won the fours.
The Leonard Trophy went to England  who beat Australia into first place by virtue of having a higher shot percentage.

Medallists

Results

Men's singles – round robin

+ Silver medal by virtue of higher shot percentage

Men's pairs – round robin

+ injury replacement

Men's triples – round robin

Men's fours – round robin

+ injury replacement

W.M.Leonard Trophy

References

World Outdoor Bowls Championship
Bowls in Australia
Sports competitions in Melbourne
1980 in Australian sport
1980 in bowls
January 1980 sports events in Australia
February 1980 sports events in Australia